The Clyde River, also known as the River Clyde, part of the River Derwent catchment, is a perennial river located in the Midlands region of Tasmania, Australia.

Course and features

See also

Rivers of Tasmania

References

Midlands (Tasmania)
River Derwent (Tasmania)